Salvadorean singer Álvaro Torres has released twenty studio albums, thirty-three singles and several compilation albums.

In December 1975, Torres began the recording of his first production entitled Algo Especial, which began to be heard on broadcasters throughout the country. In 1977, Torres moved to Guatemala and recorded four studio albums: Acaríciame, Qué Lástima, De Qué Me Sirve Quererte and Ángel de Ternura. In 1983 he moved to United States and recorded Sin Cadenas in 1984 and Tres in 1985.

Then he recorded Más Romántico Que Nadie in 1987, Si Estuvieras Conmigo in 1990 y Nada Se Compara Contigo in 1991. In the 1990s, Torres recorded Homenaje a México (1992), Amor del Alma (1993), Reencuentro (1995), En Busca del Amor (1996) y El Último Romántico (1998). In 2009, Torres released his first christian album Muy Personal and in 2016 he released Otra Vida.

Albums

Studio albums

Singles

As lead artist

As featured artist

References

External links
 Official website
 Álvaro Torres at AllMusic
 
 

Pop music discographies
Discographies of Salvadoran artists